Third World is the 1976 debut album of the Jamaican reggae group Third World.

The Allmusic review hails the album as “a brilliant debut” … “from a band whose desire was to infuse reggae with other influences, continuing a direction in Jamaican music that was perhaps best expressed by artists along the lines of Count Ossie and Ras Michael and the Sons of Negus.”

The album contains original material as well as cover versions of the Abyssinians’ classic song “Satta Massagana”” and Burning Spear's “Slavery Days”, from his album Marcus Garvey of the previous year.

A serious lead guitarist, "Cat" Coore, was said to be “a real rarity in Jamaican music of the period.”

Track listing
Track listing in Discogs:

Personnel
Third World
Milton "Prilly" Hamilton - vocals
Steven "Cat" Coore - lead guitar
Richard "Richie" Daley - bass
Michael "Ibo" Cooper - keyboards
Cornell Marshall - drums
Irvin "Carrot" Jarrett - percussions

Production
Produced by Chris Blackwell.
Cover painting by Tony Wright.

References

Third World (band) albums
1976 debut albums
Island Records albums
Albums produced by Chris Blackwell